Mosili Makuta, is a Mosotho actress.

Career
In 2016, she acted in the Mosotho play My Father's Daughter – Qomatse alongside South African legendary actor Jerry Mofokeng. She played the role 'Dipuo'. The play officially launched on 23 May 2016 in Bloemfontein.

In 2017, Makuta acted in the South African film Five Fingers for Marseilles. She played the role as a good police officer. The film received positive reviews and selected for screening at the Toronto International Film Festival (TIFF) from 7 to 17 September 2017.

Filmography

References

External links
 

Living people
Sotho people
South African actresses
Year of birth missing (living people)